Heinz Bielig is a retired slalom canoeist who competed for East Germany in the mid-to-late 1950s. He won four medals at the ICF Canoe Slalom World Championships with two golds (Folding K-1 team: 1957, 1959) and two bronzes (Folding K-1: 1957, 1959).

References

German male canoeists
Possibly living people
Year of birth missing (living people)
Medalists at the ICF Canoe Slalom World Championships